The boys' 800 metre freestyle event in swimming at the 2014 Summer Youth Olympics took place on 21 August at the Nanjing Olympic Sports Centre in Nanjing, China.

This event was a timed-final where each swimmer swam just once. The top 8 seeded swimmers swam in the evening, and the remaining swimmers swam in the morning sessions.

Results

The first round was held on August 21, at 10:53, and the final was held on August 21, at 18:00.

References

Swimming at the 2014 Summer Youth Olympics